Muhammad Al Mahdi bin Sayyid Muhammad es Senussi, also Sayyid Muhammad ibn Muhammad ibn Muhammad al-Mahdi Ali al-Sanusi, (1844–1902), was the supreme leader of the Sufi Senussi Order between 1859 and his death in 1902 in Libya.

Early years
Muhammad Al-Mahdi was the son of the founder of the Senussi Order, Muhammad ibn Ali as-Senussi. He was born in the town of Bayda in northern Cyrenaica, present day northeastern Libya,  He succeeded his father after his death as leader in 1859. Ottoman interference had forced the Senussi to leave coastal Bayda for the desert village of Jaghbub in 1856, where they built an Islamic university, mosque and palace. The later Senussi and Libyan leader King Idris was born here.

Kufra
In 1895 following interference by the Ottomans Al-Mahdi moved again, much further south to the Kufra oasis in the Libyan Desert subregion of the Sahara. Nonetheless, the Ottoman Sultan Abdulhamid II twice sent his aide-de-camp Azmzade Sadik El Mueyyed to meet Sheikh Senussi to cultivate positive relations and counter the West European scramble for Africa (see Azmzade 2021).  In Kufra Al-Mahdi founded the village of El Tag (English – "crown"), on a rise above the oasis with a Zaouia and mosque. His tomb is here, making El-Tag a holy place of the Senussi order.

Senussi order
Under the leadership of Al-Mahdi, the Senussi order arrived at the height of their influence and spread, building their Zaouias where water and pasture were available, and spreading south to the Ouaddaï Region and Lake Chad. The Oasis of Kufra became the center of commerce for the desert regions, with caravans coming from the Sahel and the Maghreb. The traders and their caravans took Senussi Islam to remote areas, such as the Darfur and Kanem regions, beyond Saharan North Africa.

References
 See https://www.amazon.com/Journey-Grand-Sahara-Africa-Through/dp/1737129884/ref=sr_1_2?dchild=1&qid=1631629056&refinements=p_27%3AGiyas+M+Gokkent&s=books&sr=1-2&text=Giyas+M+Gokkent

Notes

Muhammad Al-Mahdi
1844 births
1902 deaths
Bayda, Libya
History of Cyrenaica
Libyan Muslims
Libyan people of Algerian descent
Banu Idris
19th-century Arabs